Pedro Aroche de los Monteros (born March 14, 1946) is a retired male race walker from Mexico.

Personal bests
20 km: 1:23:22 hrs – 1979

Achievements

References
sports-reference

1946 births
Living people
Mexican male racewalkers
Athletes (track and field) at the 1972 Summer Olympics
Olympic athletes of Mexico
Central American and Caribbean Games silver medalists for Mexico
Competitors at the 1974 Central American and Caribbean Games
Central American and Caribbean Games medalists in athletics
20th-century Mexican people